Francisco Petrone (August 14, 1902 – March 11, 1967) was an Argentine film actor.
He is best known for his roles in the 1940s in the classic film La Guerra Gaucha (1942) and A Real Man (Todo un hombre) (1943), for which he won the Silver Condor Award for Best Actor at the 1944 Argentine Film Critics Association Awards.

Selected films

 1935 Monte Criollo
 1936 Sombras porteñas
 1937 La fuga
 1939 Hermanos (Brothers)
 1939 Prisioneros de la tierra
 1939 Turbión
 1941 Persona honrada se necesita (Honest Person Needed)
 1941 White Eagle
 1942 La guerra gaucha (The Gaucho War)
 1942 El viejo Hucha (The Old Skinflint)
 1943 Todo un hombre (What a Man)
 1945 Savage Pampas
 1947 Como tú lo soñaste
 1954 La duda (The Doubt)
 1956 Historia de un marido infiel
 1957 Todo sea para bien
 1959 El dinero de Dios (God's Money)
 1962 El hombre de la esquina rosada (Man on Pink Corner)
 1965 El reñidero

References

External links
 

1902 births
1967 deaths
Argentine male film actors
People from Buenos Aires
Burials at La Chacarita Cemetery
Silver Condor Award for Best Actor winners
20th-century Argentine male actors